Elizabeth R. Douvan (1926–2002) was an American psychologist, being the Catherine Neaffie Kellogg Professor of Psychology and Women's Studies at University of Michigan.

Education
PhD, University of Michigan, (1951)
BA, Vassar College, (1946)

References

1926 births
2002 deaths
University of Michigan faculty
American women psychologists
20th-century American psychologists
Vassar College alumni
University of Michigan alumni
20th-century American women
20th-century American people
American women academics